The 43rd Antalya Golden Orange Film Festival was held from September 16 to 23 2006 in Antalya, Turkey. The venue for the award ceremony on September 23, 2007 was moved from the open air amphitheater Aspendos to a smaller one at the Glass Pyramid Sabancı Congress and Exhibition Center in the downtown of Antalya due to bad weather conditions. It was run in conjunction with the 2nd International Eurasia Film Festival.

Awards

National feature film competition

Jury special awards

National documentary film competition

External links
September 14, 2006	

Golden orange
Golden Orange
Antalya Golden Orange Film Festival
A
21st century in Antalya